Green Spring refers to the following places in the U.S. state of Virginia:
Green Spring Plantation in James City County
Green Spring, Frederick County, Virginia
Green Spring, Washington County, Virginia